First Manhattan Co. (FMC) was founded in 1964 by a group of financial industry executives led by David "Sandy" Gottesman. FMC remains an owner-operated investment advisory firm.  Robert Gottesman, David Gottesman's son, is currently the firm's CEO.

FMC is based in New York City.

Background

FMC provides professional investment management services to high-net-worth individuals, as well as to partnerships, trusts, retirement accounts, mutual funds and institutional clients.  The firm manages investments on a fully discretionary basis for accounts ranging from under $1 million to over $100 million.  The firm currently manages in excess of $16 billion, utilizing a long-term, value-oriented investment approach.

The firm's clients are significant owners of Berkshire Hathaway stock, and the firm has established a reputation for utilizing investing strategies similar to that espoused by Warren Buffett. The firm's founder, David Gottesman, was an early investor in Berkshire Hathaway and he has maintained a long-standing friendship with Mr. Buffett. The firm's investment approach is to establish long term positions in portfolio companies, most often relying on fundamental analysis and targeting value in the public equity and fixed income markets of the United States.

Leadership

David Gottesman founded the firm in 1964. Mr. Gottesman is a member of the Board of Directors of Berkshire Hathaway, Inc. He was a director of the Securities Industry Association.

Robert Gottesman joined First Manhattan Co. in 1987 and is currently the firm's Chief Executive Officer and Chairman of the Management Committee.

The firm's Management Committee is responsible for the management and day-to-day operations of the firm. It is currently composed of: Robert Gottesman (CEO), Cheryl Kallem (CFO), Timothy Muccia, Neal Stearns, Jack Varon and Jay Vodofsky.

Recent Developments
In an unusual step for FMC, the firm took an active role in a proxy contest involving the management of a biotech company, VIVUS, Inc., a company in which the firm and its clients hold a significant position. FMC led the initiative to replace the board and its CEO.  The contest was settled in July 2013 with the company appointing a new CEO and replacing a majority of the board in an effort to maximize shareholder value.

Other
The firm currently advises two mutual funds, the FMC Select Fund and the FMC Strategic Value Fund.

References

External links

Financial services companies established in 1964
Financial services companies based in New York City
Investment management companies of the United States
American companies established in 1964
1964 establishments in New York (state)